Dostlik may refer to several places in Uzbekistan:

 Dostlik, Fergana Region, an urban-type settlement
 Doʻstlik District, Jizzakh Region
 Doʻstlik, Jizzakh Region, a city
 Dostlik, Surxondaryo Region, an urban-type settlement
 Doʻstlik, Yangi Namangan District, Namangan Region
 Dostlik (Tashkent Metro)